International Ministries is an international Baptist Christian missionary society. It is a constituent board affiliated with the American Baptist Churches USA. The headquarters is in King of Prussia, Pennsylvania, United States.

History

The society was founded in 1814 as the Baptist Board for Foreign Missions by the Triennial Convention (now American Baptist Churches USA). The first mission of the organization took place in Burma with the missionaries Adoniram Judson and Ann Hasseltine Judson in 1814. Other missions that followed took place in Siam in 1833, India in 1840, China in 1842, Japan in 1872 and Philippines in 1900. In the late 1800s, the society helped fund the Swedish Baptist conference's new seminary, Bethel Seminary, in Stockholm.

It was renamed American Baptist Missionary Union in 1845, American Baptist Foreign Mission Society in 1910, and American Board of International Ministries in 1973. In 2018, it had 1,800 volunteers in 70 countries.

Prominent American Baptist missionaries

 George Boardman, Burma, 1801-1831
 Clinton Caldwell Boone, 1901-1910
 Lott Cary, Liberia, 1821-1828
 David Crockett Graham, Sichuan, China, 1911-1948
 Marilla Baker Ingalls (1828-1902), Burma 1851-1902
 John Taylor Jones, Thailand 1832-1851
 Adoniram Judson, Burma, 1813-1850
 Louis F. Knoll, India
 William M. Mitchell, Canada, fl. 1859
 Issachar Jacox Roberts, Macao and China, ca. 1837-1862
 Charlotte White, Digah, India, 1816-1826

See also

19th-century Protestant missions in China
American Baptist Home Mission Society
Baptist Christianity in Sichuan
Central Philippine University (The first Baptist university in Asia established by William Orison Valentine)
Christianity in China
Convention of Philippine Baptist Churches
Emmanuel Baptist Church (Yangon, Burma)
List of Protestant missionaries in China
Protestant missionary societies in China during the 19th Century
Timeline of Chinese history

References

Primary sources
 The Baptist missionary magazine Multiple issues online free from 19th century

External links
American Baptist International Ministries Official Website
American Baptist Historical Society website
Proceedings of the Baptist convention for missionary purposes: held in Philadelphia, in May, 1814, American Baptist Foreign Mission Society  (Printed for the convention by Ann Coles, 1814)

1814 establishments in Asia
 American Baptist International Ministries
Baptist organizations in the United States
Baptist missionary societies
Christian missions in China
American Baptist Churches USA
Religious organizations established in 1814

zh:美北浸礼会